Natalia Tychler (born 28 August 1973) is a South African fencer. She competed in the women's individual and team épée events at the 2004 Summer Olympics. She has won multiple national titles, and has represented South Africa four times at the World Championships. Her father-in-law, David Tyshler, won a bronze medal at the 1956 Summer Olympics.

References

External links
 

1973 births
Living people
South African female épée fencers
Olympic fencers of South Africa
Fencers at the 2004 Summer Olympics
Sportspeople from Moscow